Pieszyce  is a town in Dzierżoniów County, Lower Silesian Voivodeship, in south-western Poland. It is the seat of the administrative district (gmina) Gmina Pieszyce.

Geography

As of 2019, the town has a population of 7,123.

History

The Waldhufendorf settlement in the Duchy of Silesia, one of the duchies of fragmented Poland, was first mentioned in a 1250 deed. The first church was built in the 13th century. In 1291 it fell with the lands of Świdnica to the Silesian Duchy of Jawor, which upon the death of Duke Bolko II the Small in 1368 was ruled by the Kings of Bohemia.

From the 16th century onwards, Pieszyce (Peterswaldau) developed as a centre of weaving. The Lords of Perswaldau had a castle erected in 1617, which was rebuilt in a Baroque style in 1710. The Polish-Saxon cabinet minister Erdmann II of Promnitz acquired the estates in 1721 and gained the privilege to fabricate woven goods by Emperor Charles VI.

With most of Silesia, Peterswaldau was annexed from Habsburg-ruled Bohemia by Prussia after the First Silesian War in 1742. In 1765 the lordship passed to Count Christian Frederick of Stolberg-Wernigerode, whose descendants held the estates until their expulsion in 1945. The social hardship of the population in the course of the 19th century industrialisation was perpetuated by the famous Silesian author Gerhart Hauptmann in his play The Weavers, which is set in Peterswaldau. From 1871 the village was part of Germany. During World War II, Nazi Germans operated a women's subcamp of the Gross-Rosen concentration camp in the town. In 1945, after Nazi Germany's defeat in the war, the town became again part of Poland. It was granted town rights in 1962. From 1975 to 1998 Pieszyce was administratively located in Wałbrzych Voivodeship.

Sights
The most significant historic landmarks of the town are:
Pieszyce Castle complex
Saint James church
Saint Anthony church

Sports
The local football club is Pogoń Pieszyce. It competes in the lower leagues.

Notable people
Anna of Stolberg-Wernigerode (1819–1868), deaconess and matron of the Bethanien hospital in Berlin

Twin towns – sister cities
See twin towns of Gmina Pieszyce.

References

External links
Jewish Community in Pieszyce on Virtual Shtetl

Cities and towns in Lower Silesian Voivodeship
Dzierżoniów County